Franco Bolelli (July 8, 1950 – October 5, 2020) was an Italian philosopher. His philosophical influences included Nietzsche and Taoism.

Books

Tutta la Verita' sull'Amore, with Manuela Mantegazza (Sperling & Kupfer, 2015)
Si Fa Così (ADD, 2013)
Giocate! (ADD, 2012)
Viva Tutto! with Lorenzo Jovanotti Cherubini (ADD, 2010)
 Cartesio non balla, Garzanti, 2007, 
 Con il cuore e con le palle, Garzanti, 2005, 
 Più mondi, BCD editore, 2002, 
 Live Castelvecchi, 1997, 
 Vota te stesso, Castelvecchi, 1996, 
Come Ibra, Kobe, Bruce Lee, Bolelli, F.

References

20th-century Italian philosophers
21st-century Italian philosophers
1950 births
2020 deaths
Italian male non-fiction writers
20th-century Italian male writers
21st-century Italian male writers